Motiong, officially the Municipality of Motiong, is a 4th class municipality in the province of Samar, Philippines. According to the 2020 census, it has a population of 15,276 people.

History 
Long before the coming of the Americans, there were already local folks inhabited in Motiong, wherein the place was unnamed at that time.

Some of these people went on sea diving to gather oyster for their daily consumption and the rest barter goods such as rice, corn, cassava, taro, yam tubers, sea foods and abaca fibers to other neighboring barrios and municipalities. There were only few local caravans who are traveling in groups aided in defense against bandits as well as helped to improve economies of scale in trade although, only few people have the means to buy commodities.

One man tried to open one oyster and with great astonishment, he found a lustrous pearl where he called “Mutya”. Believing that the place was full of treasure, the settlers started to name the place “Mutya” which to means “Land of Treasure”.

The bridge near Motiong was once used to ambush the Japanese in World War II.

Mariano Sapetin, Valentin Conge, Simon Tingzon Sr., Claudio Tingzon and Antonio Abalos were few people who persuaded to make Motiong an independent town. The reward of their effort was the House Bill No. 1844 by Congressman Tito V. Tizon which was approved as Republic Act No. 290 on June 16, 1948. It separated into another town the barrios of Motiong, Bayog, Uyandic, Calantawan, Sinampigan, Calape, Bonga, Hinicaan, Caluyahan, Malolobog, and Maypangi, formerly part of the town of Wright. Mariano Sapetin and Antonio Uy were appointed as first mayor and vice mayor respectively.

Geography

Barangays 
Motiong is politically subdivided into 30 barangays namely as follows:

Climate

Demographics

Economy

References

External links
 Motiong Profile at PhilAtlas.com
 [ Philippine Standard Geographic Code]
 Philippine Census Information
 Local Governance Performance Management System

Municipalities of Samar (province)